Kelab Sukan dan Rekreasi Syarikat Air Negeri Sembilan, simply known as KSR Sains, is a Malaysian professional football club based in Seremban, Negeri Sembilan. They currently play in the second division of the Malaysian football league system, the Malaysia M3 League.

History
KSR Sains started fielding a football team for Malaysia's domestic competitions the M-League in 2018.
In 2019, the club has won the play-off, winning promotion to the 2020 M3 League.

Players

Management team

Club personnel
 Manager: Mohamad Afif Anuar
 Assistant Manager: Azizul Hamzah
 Head coach: Hamizar Hamzah
 Assistant coach : Yosri Derma Raju
 Goalkeeping coach: Fadil Mohd Faksi@Mohd Fausi
 Fitness coach: Mohd Kamil Ujang
 Physio : Muhammad Azri Raffi

Honours

League
Malaysia M4 League
  Playoff winners (1): 2019
 PBNS President 
  Winners (1):   2019
  Runners-up (2): 2017, 2018

References

Malaysia M3 League
Football clubs in Malaysia